The 1981 Penn State Nittany Lions football team represented Pennsylvania State University during the 1981 NCAA Division I-A football season. The team was selected national champion by Dunkel, an NCAA-designated major selector, while Clemson was the consensus national champion.

Schedule

Roster

Game summaries

at Nebraska

Boston College

Notre Dame

Source: Eugene Register-Guard
    
    
    
    
    
    
    

Following the game, Penn State accepted an invitation to the Fiesta Bowl.

Pittsburgh

Source: 

The Nittany Lions snapped the Panthers' 17-game winning streak in convincing fashion.

vs. USC (Fiesta Bowl)

Source:

NFL Draft
Ten Nittany Lions were drafted in the 1982 NFL Draft.

Awards
 Joe Paterno
Bobby Dodd Coach of the Year Award

References

Penn State
Penn State Nittany Lions football seasons
Fiesta Bowl champion seasons
Lambert-Meadowlands Trophy seasons
Penn State Nittany Lions football